Lobelia polyphylla, called the tabaco del Diablo (along with Lobelia tupa), is a species of flowering plant in the family Campanulaceae, native to northern and central Chile. When smoked, it has narcotic and hallucinogenic effects.

References

polyphylla
Endemic flora of Chile
Flora of northern Chile
Flora of central Chile
Plants described in 1830